The 1953 Ice Hockey World Championships  were the 20th World Championships and the 31st European Championships in ice hockey.  The tournament took place between March 7 and March 15, 1953, in Basel and Zurich, Switzerland.  Sweden won their first World Championship title and their seventh European Championship title.

This was the first world championship tournament with only European teams; on January 12, 1953, Canadian Amateur Hockey Association president W. B. George stated Canada would not be sending a team to the 1953 World Championships. He told the press: "Every year we spend C$10,000 to send a Canadian hockey team to Europe to play 40 exhibition games. All these games are played to packed houses that only enrich European hockey coffers. In return we are subjected to constant, unnecessary abuse over our Canadian style of play".

Also absent were the Soviet Union; it was hoped that the USSR would participate but they did not, but they sent observers, including coach Anatoli Tarasov, to scout the tournament. It is believed that injuries to their star players, including Vsevolod Bobrov, was the reason behind the decision.

Czechoslovakia were withdrawn from the tournament by General František Janda, the Chairman of the State Committee for the Physical Education and Sport, who ordered the team home when it became obvious their President, Klement Gottwald, was going to die from pneumonia he contracted at Stalin's funeral. Gottwald died the next day, March 14, 1953; subsequently, the team was disqualified, with their results being deleted from the records and their remaining games cancelled.

World Championships Group A (Switzerland)

Table

World Championships Group B (Switzerland) 
Also participating was a Swiss 'B' team who (if their games counted) would have finished third.

Table

Citations

References
Complete results

Men's World Championships
IIHF Men's World Ice Hockey Championships
International ice hockey competitions hosted by Switzerland
1952–53 in Swiss ice hockey
March 1953 sports events in Europe
20th century in Zürich
Sports competitions in Basel
Sports competitions in Zürich
20th century in Basel